Suffren can have the following meanings:

People:
 Joseph Jean Baptiste Suffren (1651-1737)
Pierre André de Suffren de Saint Tropez (1729–1788), French admiral

Ships:
 French ship Suffren, eight ships of the French Navy named after the admiral
 Suffren, a steamship originally named Blücher (steamship)